The Shire of Halls Creek is one of the four local government areas in the Kimberley region of northern Western Australia, covering an area of , most of which is sparsely populated. The Shire's seat of government is the town of Halls Creek. Many Aboriginal communities are located within the shire.

The Purnululu National Park, home to part of the Bungle Bungle Range, and Gregory Lake are within the Shire, as is the Wolfe Creek Meteorite Crater National Park.

History

The Shire of Halls Creek originated as the Kimberley Goldfields Road District on 10 February 1887. It was renamed the Halls Creek Road District on 8 January 1915. On 1 July 1961, it became a shire following the passage of the Local Government Act 1960, which reformed all remaining road districts into shires.

Stations
The area is home to many large cattle stations including Bedford Downs Station, which was established some time prior to 1906 by the Buchanan and Gordon brothers. Other properties in the area include Alice Downs, Louisa Downs, Moola Bulla, Springvale and Ruby Plains Station.

Elected council
Councillors are elected at-large to represent the whole shire.

Previously the council consisted of three wards. A review of wards and representation was carried out in late 2008 and, at its December 2008 meeting, the council resolved to recommend to the Local Government Advisory Board that the wards be abolished.

Towns and localities
The towns and localities of the Shire of Halls Creek with population and size figures based on the most recent Australian census:

(* indicates locality is only partially located within this shire)

Indigenous communities
Indigenous communities in the Shire of Halls Creek:

 Balgo
 Billiluna (Mindibungu)
 Halls Creek
 Mulan
 Kundat Djaru (Ringer Soak)
 Warmun (Turkey Creek)
 Yiyili

Heritage-listed places

As of 2023, 27 places are heritage-listed in the Shire of Halls Creek, of which five are on the State Register of Heritage Places.

References

External links
 

Halls Creek